This is an inclusive list of science fiction television programs whose names begin with the letter B.

B

Live-action
Babylon 5 (franchise):
Babylon 5 (1993–1998)
Babylon 5: A Call to Arms (1999, fourth film)
Babylon 5: In the Beginning (1998, first film)
Babylon 5: The Gathering (1993, pilot)
Babylon 5: The Legend of the Rangers (2002, spin-off film)
Babylon 5: The Lost Tales (2007, anthology)
Babylon 5: The River of Souls (1998, third film)
Babylon 5: Thirdspace (1998, second film)
Crusade (1999, Babylon 5 spin-off)
Batman (franchise):
Batman (1966–1968)
Battlestar Galactica (franchise):
Battlestar Galactica (1978–1979)
Galactica 1980 (1980, Battlestar Galactica 1978 spin-off)
Battlestar Galactica (2004–2009)
Battlestar Galactica (2003, miniseries)
Battlestar Galactica: Razor (2007, film)
Battlestar Galactica: The Plan (2009, film)
Caprica (2010–2011, Battlestar Galactica 2004 prequel)
Battlestar Galactica: Blood & Chrome (2011, pilot)
Baywatch Nights (1995–1997) (elements of science fiction in season 2 episodes)
Being Erica (2009–2011, Canada)
Ben 10 (franchise):
Ben 10: Race Against Time (2007, film)
Ben 10: Alien Swarm (2009, film)
Benji, Zax and the Alien Prince (1983)
Beyond Re-Animator (2003, film)
Beyond Reality (1991–1993) (elements of science fiction in some episodes)
Beyond Westworld (1980)
Big Bad Beetleborgs  Beetleborgs Metallix (1996–1998)
Big Pull, The (1962, UK)
Bigfoot and Wildboy (1977)
Bio Planet WoO (2006, Japan)
Bionic Woman (franchise):
Bionic Woman, The (1976–1978)
Bionic Woman (2007)
Birds of Prey (2002–2003)
Black Mirror (2011–present, UK, anthology)
Black Scorpion (2001)
Blake's 7 (1978–1981)
Black Lightning (2018–2021)
Blindpassasjer (1978, Norway)
Blood Drive (2017)
Blue Thunder (1984)
Borealis (2013, pilot, Canada) IMDb
Boy from Andromeda, The (1991, New Zealand, miniseries) IMDb
BrainDead (2016)
Brave New World (1998, film)
Brick Bradford (1947)
Brimstone (1998)
Buck Rogers in the 25th Century (1979–1981)
Buffy the Vampire Slayer (1997–2003) (elements of science fiction, primarily in seasons 4 and 6)
Bugs (1995–1999, UK)
Bunker, or Learning Underground (2006–2007, Russia)
Burning Zone, The (1996–1997)

Animated
Babel II (franchise):
Babel II (1973, Japan, animated)
Babel II: Beyond Infinity (2001, Japan, animated)
Back to the Future: The Animated Series (1991–1992, animated)
Batman (franchise):
Batman/Superman Hour, The (1968–1969, animated)
Adventures of Batman and Robin the Boy Wonder, The (1969–1970, animated)
New Adventures of Batman, The (1977–1981, animated)
Batman: The Animated Series (1992–1995, animated)
New Batman Adventures, The a.k.a. TNBA (1997–1999, Batman: The Animated Series sequel, animated)
Batman Beyond (1999–2001, animated)
Batman, The (2004–2008, animated)
Batman: The Brave and the Bold (2008–2011, animated)
Beware the Batman (2013–2014, animated)
BattleTech: The Animated Series (1994, animated)
Battletoads (1992, Canada/US, special, pilot, animated)
Ben 10 (franchise):
Ben 10 (2005–2008, animated)
Ben 10: Secret of the Omnitrix (2007, animated, film)
Ben 10: Alien Force (2008–2010, animated)
Ben 10: Ultimate Alien (2010–2012, animated)
Ben 10: Destroy All Aliens a.k.a. Ben 10: Alien Dimensions (2012, film, animated)
Ben 10: Omniverse (2012–2014, animated)
Ben 10 (2016–2021, animated)
Big Guy and Rusty the Boy Robot, The (1999–2001, animated)
Big O, The (1999–2000, 2003, Japan, animated)
Biker Mice from Mars (franchise):
Biker Mice from Mars (1993–1996, animated)
Biker Mice from Mars (2006–2007, animated)
Bill & Ted's Excellent Adventures (1990–1991, animated)
Bionic Six (1987–1989, animated)
Birdman and the Galaxy Trio (1967–1969, animated)
Black Heaven (1999, Japan, animated)
Black Panther (2010, animated)
Blassreiter (2008, Japan, animated)
Blocker Gundan 4 Machine Blaster (1976–1977, Japan, animated)
Blue Comet SPT Layzner (1985–1986, Japan, animated) a.k.a. Blue Meteor SPT Layzner (US)
Blue Drop: Tenshitachi no Gikyoku (2007, Japan, animated)
Blue Gender (1999–2000, Japan, animated)
Bodacious Space Pirates (2012, Japan, animated)
Bokurano (2007, Japan, animated)
Bounty Hamster (2003, animated)
Brats of the Lost Nebula (1998–1999, animated, puppetry)
Brave series (franchise)
Brave Exkaiser (1990–1991, Japan, animated)
Brave Fighter of Sun Fighbird, The (1991–1992, Japan, animated)
Brave Fighter of Legend Da-Garn, The (1992–1993, Japan, animated)
Brave Express Might Gaine, The (1993–1994, Japan, animated)
Brave Police J-Decker (1994–1995, Japan, animated)
Brave of Gold Goldran, The (1995–1996, Japan, animated)
Brave Command Dagwon (1996–1997, Japan, animated)
King of Braves GaoGaiGar, The (1997–1998, Japan, animated)
Betterman (1999, Japan, animated)
King of Braves GaoGaiGar Final -Grand Glorious Gathering-, The (2005, Japan, animated)
BraveStarr (1987–1988, animated)
Bubblegum Crisis Tokyo 2040 (1998–1999, Japan, animated)
Bucky O'Hare and the Toad Wars (1991, UK/US, animated)
Buddy Complex (2014, Japan, animated)
Bureau of Alien Detectors (1996, animated)
Burst Angel (2004, Japan, animated)
Buzz Lightyear of Star Command (2000–2002, animated)

References

Television programs, B